Masataka Takayama (高山 正隆, Takayama Masataka; 15 May 1895 - 14 April 1981) was one of the most prominent Japanese photographers in the first half of the twentieth century.

Takayama was born in Tokyo, Japan. As an amateur photographer, he published many of his works in the magazine Geijutsu Shashin Kenkyū (芸術写真研究), beginning in the 1920s.  He remained an active photographer even after World War II.

He was talented at pictorialist (art) photography and took many photographs using a soft focus lens and deformation and "wipe-out" techniques.

Takayama usually used a "vest-pocket" Kodak camera (a very compact folding model taking 127 film) with a single-element lens (a tangyoku lens in Japanese). These cameras (and Japanese derivatives such as the Rokuoh-sha Pearlette and Minolta Vest) were popular in Japan at the time for snapshot use, and called ves-tan (ベス単, in Japanese pronunciation besutan) cameras; "ves" coming from "vest" and "tan" from tangyoku. Takayama's works are thus said to belong to the "ves-tan" (besutan) school.

References 
Kaneko Ryūichi. Modern Photography in Japan 1915-1940. San Francisco: Friends of Photography, 2001. 
Tucker, Anne Wilkes, et al. The History of Japanese Photography. New Haven: Yale University Press, 2003. 
 Exhibition Catalogue for The Founding and Development of Modern Photography in Japan (日本近代写真の成立と展開展), Tokyo Metropolitan Museum of Photography (東京都写真美術館), 1995 (NO ISBN)
 Masataka Takayama and Taishō Pictorialism (『高山正隆と大正ピクトリアリズム』) Nihon no shashinka (日本の写真家, "Japanese Photographers"), volume 5. Tokyo: Iwanami Shoten (岩波書店), 1998.  

1895 births
1981 deaths
Japanese photographers
People from Tokyo